Ximena Elizabeth Rios Zarate (born 26 July 2001) is a Mexican professional football left-back who currently plays for Querétaro F.C. of the Liga MX Femenil.

Club career

Club América Femenil
A native of Tuxtla Gutiérrez, Ríos began playing for Club América Femenil's senior side in the Apertura 2017 tournament, making her debut against Club Tijuana in July 2017. Manager Leonardo Cuéllar integrated her into the first team during the Apertura 2018 tournament, as América would finish as champions. Ríos was included in the Liga MX ideal eleven for the second round of the Clausura 2020 tournament.

International career

Mexico U-17 women's national football team 

On June 12, 2018, Mexico U-17 women's national football team finished as Runners-up at the 2018 CONCACAF Women's U-17 Championship.

On December 1, 2018, Mexico U-17 women's national football team finished as Runners-up at the 2018 FIFA U-17 Women's World Cup.

Mexico U-20 women's national football team 

On March 8, 2020, Mexico U-20 women's national football team finished as Runners-up at the 2020 CONCACAF Women's U-20 Championship.

Honours

Club América Femenil
Liga MX Femenil: Champions: Apertura 2018

Mexico U-17 women's national football team
 CONCACAF Women's U-17 Championship: Runners-up: 2018
 FIFA U-17 Women's World Cup: Runners-up: 2018

Mexico U-20 women's national football team
 CONCACAF Women's U-20 Championship: Runners-up: 2020

References

External links 
 

2001 births
Living people
Mexican women's footballers
Liga MX Femenil players
Women's association footballers not categorized by position